Jonas Langmann (born December 22, 1991) is a German professional ice hockey goaltender who currently plays for the Ravensburg Towerstars in the DEL2. He previously played for the Hannover Scorpions.

Langmann played in the DEL2 before ending a six-year absence from the top flight DEL, by signing a two-year contract with the Thomas Sabo Ice Tigers on April 30, 2019.

References

External links
 

1991 births
German ice hockey goaltenders
Fischtown Pinguins players
Hamburg Freezers players
Hannover Scorpions players
Iserlohn Roosters players
Living people
People from Bad Kissingen
Sportspeople from Lower Franconia
Ravensburg Towerstars players
Thomas Sabo Ice Tigers players